Download to Donate for Haiti V2.0 is a sequel of the compilation album Download to Donate for Haiti by various artists. This is also for the benefit of the 2010 Haiti earthquake, but was released on January 11, 2011. This album was released via Download to Donate.

Background
The Music for Relief official website announced an updated version/sequel of Download to Donate for Haiti, called Download to Donate for Haiti V2.0, which was released on January 11, 2011. Some of the tracks from the first Download to Donate for Haiti were included in the album. The cause has raised more than $26,000. The donations support Artists for Peace and Justice, charity: water, Direct Relief, Partners In Health and the United Nations Foundation, as well as reconstruction and the delivery of food, water and medical care in Haiti.

On February 22, 2011, Linkin Park members Chester Bennington, Brad Delson, Joe Hahn and Rob Bourdon joined United Nations Secretary General Ban Ki-moon in a Facebook Town Hall discussion on their continued work on raising efforts on awareness of Haiti. Fans were also encouraged to participate in the Download to Donate campaign.

The songs were no longer available for download after December 10, 2011. Music for Relief selected the Haitian Education and Leadership Program, or HELP, a program that gives higher education to young Haitians, as the final beneficiary of funds raised through Download to Donate for Haiti V2.0. Music for Relief still accepts donations for Haiti.

Track listing

References

2011 compilation albums
Charity albums
Albums produced by Mike Shinoda